The Auckland Rugby League competition has been competed for since 1909 when the first organised match was played between North Shore and City Rovers (won 44–22 by North Shore). The following year an official champion was crowned for the first time, namely the City Rovers club who won the 1910 1st Grade title and were one of the 4 original teams at that time (City Rovers, Devonport United, Newton Rangers, and Ponsonby United). Over the following 110 years many team and individual trophies have been awarded. The following is a list of the clubs and individuals that they have been awarded to at the premier-grade level.

Trophies

There are approximately 24 trophies which have been competed for in Auckland Rugby League history by clubs. These include the following for teams; Fox Memorial Shield, Rukutai Shield, Roope Rooster, Stormont Shield, Kiwi Shield, A.R.L. Trophy, Sharman Cup, Lawson Cup, Walmsley Shield, ARL Cup, Norton Cup, Gillett Cup and the Autex Award. Several have also been awarded to players including the Lipscombe Cup, Rothville Trophy, Bert Humphries Memorial, Tetley Trophy, Painter Trophy, Hyland Memorial Cup, Doug Price Memorial Medal, Jack Counihand Trophy, Harry Mackwood Trophy and the Simons Scroll.

Explanation of team trophies
The Fox Memorial is awarded to the grand final winner of Premier One and is considered the most prestigious trophy in Auckland club rugby league. It was named after Edward Vincent Fox who played for North Shore, and Auckland before going to fight in World War I. He was awarded a medal for bravery but suffered a leg injury ending his playing career. From 1910 to 1919 the first grade trophy awarded was the Myers Cup. In the war years the trophy was not officially awarded. Then from 1920 to 1930 the Monteith Shield was awarded to the first grade champions. It was named after the man who had donated it to the league.
The Rukutai Shield is awarded to the Premier One minor or premiership champions at the end of the regular season. It is named after Jim Rukutai who was an early player in Auckland Rugby League and later became the youngest-ever coach of New Zealand at the age of 33.
The Roope Rooster was first competed for in 1915. It was named after Dick Roope who donated the trophy when he was Auckland Rugby League Chairman. For the first few decades of its existence it was a knockout competition played after the championship was completed but later moved to being a pre-season competition. In 2006 it changed format when it became a trophy which only changes hand when the holder of the trophy loses a match on their home ground.
The Stormont Shield is named after Bill Stormont (William Devanney Stormont), a World War I veteran who played for the Marist club and for the Kiwis. The Shield is a champion of champions playoff between the Fox Memorial and Roope Rooster winners and has been competed for since 1925.
The Kiwi Shield is awarded to the Premier One club with the most points scored from Premiers and Reserves (x1).
Club of the Year. Awarded to the club in Auckland considered to have achieved the most in an all-round sense.

Premier One titles

Total Fox Memorial First Grade Titles (includes Myers Cup and Monteith Shield)
16: Mt Albert
12: Otahuhu, Ponsonby
11: Richmond
8: City Rovers
7: Northcote
6: North Shore Albions/Devonport United, Marist, Pt Chevalier
5: Glenora
4: Eastern United
3: Manukau
2: Newton Rangers, Ellerslie, Howick, Western United, Manurewa
1: Grafton Athletic, Maritime, Mt Wellington, Te Atatu, Otara, Mangere East, Hibiscus Coast, and Papakura.

Roope Rooster

Premier two and three titles
The Sharman Cup has been awarded to the Premier 2 Championship winners in recent years; however, originally it was awarded to the Premier 2 Minor Championship winners. It was gifted to Auckland Rugby League in October 1934 by Mr. Sharman of George Court and Sons. He was moving from New Zealand to live in England and wished to leave a happy memory behind of his involvement in Auckland rugby league.
The Lawson Cup was awarded to the Premier 2 Major Champions, and in essence it has been replaced by the Sharman Cup.
The Norton Cup was originally awarded to the Senior B Grade (second division) champions however in 1931 it was awarded to the reserve grade winners which superseded the second division for a period of time.
The Phelan Shield has been awarded to the Premier 3 Major Champions. The Phelan Shield replaced the ARL Trophy (first awarded in 1989); however, from 2015 it was awarded to the Premier 2 Minor Champion as the competition reverted to a two-division structure. It was donated to the league in 1934 by Ted Phelan and was won in its inaugural season by Newton Rangers. At this point it was competed for by teams who were eliminated from the Roope Rooster in the first round.

Explanation of player trophies
The Fox Memorial Player of the Year is awarded to the player who accrues the most votes from coaches voting for the best player in their team and the opposing team.
The Lipscombe Cup is awarded to the Premier One sportsman of the year, chosen by the Senior Management Committee, from nominations received from Premier clubs. 
The Rothville Trophy is awarded to the Premier One player of the year, selected by the Auckland Coach.
The Bert Humphries Memorial is awarded to the most improved forward and back in Premier One and is selected by the Auckland coach/selector.
The Tetley Trophy is awarded to the Premier One player scoring the most tries during the Rukutai Shield competition.
The Lance Painter Rose Bowl is awarded to the Premier One player kicking the most goals during the Rukutai Shield competition. It was donated by Lance Painter in June, 1944 to be awarded for place kicking.
The Hyland Memorial Cup is awarded to the most outstanding Premier/Senior Coach selected by the Senior Management Committee.
The Doug Price Memorial Medal is awarded to the player of the day in the Premier One Grand Final and is selected by a sub committee appointed by the Board of Directors.

Player trophies by year in premier one

See also

Rugby league in New Zealand

References

External links

Auckland Rugby League seasons
Rugby league in Auckland
Rugby league trophies and awards
New Zealand rugby league lists